Glenwood Cemetery could refer to:
(sorted by state, then city/town)

Glenwood Cemetery (Huntsville, Alabama), historic cemetery for African American burials
Glenwood Cemetery (Washington, D.C.)
Glenwood Cemetery (Maynard, Massachusetts), listed on the National Register of Historic Places (NRHP) in Middlesex County, Massachusetts
Glenwood Cemetery (Flint, Michigan), listed on the NRHP in Genesee County, Michigan
Glenwood Cemetery (Yazoo, Mississippi)
Glenwood Cemetery (Vernon Township, New Jersey)
Glenwood Cemetery (Watertown, Jefferson, New York)
Glenwood Cemetery (Watkins Glen, New York)
Glenwood Cemetery (Houston, Texas)
Glenwood Cemetery (Park City, Utah), on the National Register of Historic Places listings for Summit County, Utah
Glenwood Memorial Gardens (Broomall, Pennsylvania), originally called Glenwood Cemetery